Carl Moore is a Barbadian jazz critic, journalist, radio broadcaster and former head of the Barbados Broadcasting Association.

References 

Barbadian music critics
Barbadian journalists
Male journalists
Year of birth missing (living people)
Living people
Barbadian radio presenters
Jazz writers